Kobe Lloyd Franklin (born May 10, 2003) is a Canadian soccer player who plays as a defender for Toronto FC in Major League Soccer.

Early life
He began playing soccer at age four for Beach Community Soccer. Shortly after he began to play with Power Soccer Academy. When he was 9, his family moved to Chicago, where he began playing with Evanston SC before quickly joining the academy of Major League Soccer club Chicago Fire. He later returned to Toronto, joining the Toronto FC Academy in February 2017.

Career
He made his senior debut playing for the Senior Academy team, Toronto FC III, on August 19, 2018 in League1 Ontario against Ottawa South United, scoring a 94th minute goal, becoming the youngest ever goal scorer in League1 Ontario at the age of 15 years, 3 months.

On May 13, 2021, he signed his first professional contract with Toronto FC II of USL League One to join the team for the 2021 season. He made his debut for Toronto FC II on May 22, 2021 against North Texas SC. He scored his first professional goal on August 18 against Forward Madison. On October 1, he recorded two assists and set up a third goal (although was not credited with a third assist) in a 3-0 victory over North Carolina FC. For the 2021 season, he was a finalist for both the USL League One Young Player of the Year and Defender of the Year awards.

On April 1, 2022, he joined the first team, Toronto FC on a short-term four-day loan. He signed additional four day loans on April 23, May 4, and May 7. He made his Major League Soccer debut on May 4, as a second half substitute against FC Cincinnati.

In February 2023, he signed a two-year homegrown player contract with two option years with Toronto FC.

International career
Franklin represented the Canada U17 team at the 2019 FIFA U-17 World Cup. In June 2022, he was named to the Canadian U-20 team for the 2022 CONCACAF U-20 Championship.

Career statistics

Club

References

2003 births
Living people
Canadian soccer players
Association football defenders
Soccer players from Toronto
Toronto FC players
Toronto FC II players
Canada men's youth international soccer players
MLS Next Pro players
USL League One players
Major League Soccer players
Homegrown Players (MLS)